Leme is a municipality in the state of São Paulo in Brazil. The population is 104,346 (2020 est.) in an area of 403 km². At the 2000 census, it had 80,757 residents, 40,830 of whom are men and 39,927 women.  65,885 residents are 10 years old or older, and of these, 59,991, or 91.1%, are literate. Leme officially became a town on August 29, 1895 (and it celebrates its anniversary on August 29). The municipality is formed by the main district and also includes the rural neighborhoods Taquari, Taquari Ponte and Caju.

Geography
Leme has an area of about 403.1 square kilometers, located in the mid-east of São Paulo state, at about 190 kilometers (118 miles) of São Paulo. Placed in the Moji-Guaçu River's drainage basin, Leme has an annual average of about 22 °C (71.6 °F), a dry weather during winter and rainy during summer.

Its average altitude is 619 meters above sea level (2030.8 ft). The relief is lightly wavy in the urban area and in most of rural area, which makes the urban expansion and the agricultural cultivation easier, as well as the transport by bicycle (cheap and non-polluting). This kind of transport is very common in Leme.

Hydrography

  Moji-Guaçu River
  Capetinga River
  do Roque Creek
  do Meio Creek

Economy
The agricultural sector in Leme has a considerable sugar cane, maize, soybean and oranges production, which are the major crops, whereas the animal husbandry activities are more focused on cattle breeding. The industrial sector is characterized by being very varied, with manufacturers at food, bioenergy, machines, agricultural inputs, chemical products, furniture, plastic, building and electrical materials areas, and others.

The commerce and services sector at Leme is increasing. Units of many national and some international chain stores are present in the municipality.

Education
Leme has a primary and secondary education system composed by public and private institutions, including a state technical school called ETEC "Salim Sedeh", providing technical courses of management, pharmacy, multimedia, systems development and others.
Higher education institutes are also present in Leme. The city has a unit of Universidade Anhanguera and the Universidade Virtual do Estado de São Paulo.

Transportation
  Public urban transportation composed by bus lines connecting downtown to urban and rural neighborhoods 
  Bus station "José Antunes Filho" (in Portuguese: Rodoviária de Leme), connecting Leme to other cities of the State of São Paulo and other Brazilian states.
  Aerodrome "Yolanda Penteado"

Highways
  Rodovia Anhangüera (SP-330): a highway that connects the city of São Paulo to many other cities of the State of São Paulo, going through Leme.

Main attractions and events
  12 Chapels Cycling Circuit (in Portuguese: Circuito das 12 Capelas)
  Path of Faith (in Portuguese: Caminho da Fé)
  City Park "Dr. Enni Jorge Draib" (City Lake)
  Ecological Park "Mourão"
  Water Memorial "Prefeito Ricardo Landgraf"
  Manoel Leme Square (in Portuguese: Praça Manoel Leme) and the old Train Station of Leme
  Historical Museum of Leme
  São Manoel Sanctuary Diocese (in Portuguese: Santuário Diocesano de São Manoel)
  Rui Barbosa Square (in Portuguese: Praça Rui Barbosa)
  Bruno Lazzarini Stadium

Every year Leme hosts the "Festa do Peão de Leme", a large festival with Sertanejo music.

References

Municipalities in São Paulo (state)